The Mittagstock is a mountain of the Urner Alps, overlooking the Göscheneralpsee in the canton of Uri. It lies on the chain that separates the Göschenertal from the valley called Urseren.

References

External links
 Mittagstock on Hikr

Mountains of the Alps
Mountains of Switzerland
Mountains of the canton of Uri